The 2009 mayoral election in Harrisburg, Pennsylvania was held on November 3, 2009, and resulted in incumbent Democratic mayor Stephen R. Reed, who had been mayor since 1982, losing in the primary to Linda D. Thompson who went on to defeat Republican Nevin J. Mindlin to become the city's first female and first black mayor.

Background

Reed, dubbed  "Mayor-for-Life," served seven terms as Mayor of Harrisburg and was considered "Pennsylvania's most popular and successful mayor." However, near the end of his term he faced mounting corruption and fraud accusations in respect to how he was able to maintain his position for the length that he did.

Campaign

The growing discontent and mounting legal issues around Reed, coupled with an overall nationwide growth in Black voters, resulted in city councilor Linda Thompson to upset him in the primary. Harrisburg has a massive disparity in Republican and Democratic voters, highlighted by Republican candidate Nevin Mindlin winning the primary while having less votes than total Write-ins. Due to this many local pundits believed that the Republicans had no chance to win the election, however, Thompson would base her campaign on attacking Reed and white Democrats as a whole for being the reason the city has stumbled financially in recent years. This resulted in a lackluster Democratic showing for Thompson and even pushed many Democrats to vote for her Republican challenger. Thompson won the election, that had a 24.7% turnout, by only 842 individual votes with the party line being largely split down the city's ethnic line.

Results

See also
 2009 United States elections
 List of mayors of Harrisburg, Pennsylvania

References

Harrisburg
 2009
Harrisburg